Wevok (Iñupiaq: Uivvaq) is a former Iñupiat village in the western part of North Slope Borough in the U.S. state of Alaska.

Demographics

Wevok appeared once on the 1880 U.S. Census as "Cape Lisburne", an unincorporated Inuit village of 13 residents (all Inuit). The village did not report again on the census.

Climate

References

Populated places in North Slope Borough, Alaska
Chukchi Sea